Paul Kennett is a former professional rugby league footballer who played in the 1990s. He played at representative level for Wales, and at club level for Swinton.

International honours
Paul Kennett won 2 caps (plus 1 as substitute) for Wales in 1992 while at Swinton.

References

Living people
English people of Welsh descent
English rugby league players
Place of birth missing (living people)
Swinton Lions players
Wales national rugby league team players
Year of birth missing (living people)